John Horgan (born 1953) is an American science journalist best known for his 1996 book The End of Science.  He has written for many publications, including National Geographic, Scientific American, The New York Times, Time, Newsweek, and IEEE Spectrum.  His awards include two Science Journalism Awards from the American Association for the Advancement of Science and the National Association of Science Writers Science-in-Society Award. His articles have been included in the 2005, 2006 and 2007 editions of The Best American Science and Nature Writing. Since 2010 he has written the "Cross-check" blog for ScientificAmerican.com.

Horgan graduated from the Columbia University School of Journalism in 1983.  Between 1986 and 1997 he was a senior writer at Scientific American.

1990s assertions
His October 1993 Scientific American article, "The Death of Proof", claimed that the growing complexity of mathematics, combined with "computer proofs" and other developments, were undermining traditional concepts of mathematical proof.  The article generated "torrents of howls and complaints" from mathematicians, according to David Hoffman (one of the mathematicians Horgan interviewed for the article). In response to this article, the Horgan surface is, sarcastically, named after him.  It is a speculated embedded minimal surface whose existence is strongly suggested by computers but doubted by many mathematicians.  The non-existence of the Horgan surface is later established rigorously through a mathematical proof, completing the sarcasm with the term "Horgan non-surface".

Horgan's 1996 book The End of Science begins where "The Death of Proof" leaves off: in it, Horgan argues that pure science, defined as "the primordial human quest to understand the universe and our place in it," may be coming to an end.  Horgan claims that science will not achieve insights into nature as profound as evolution by natural selection, the double helix, the Big Bang, relativity theory or quantum mechanics. In the future, he suggests, scientists will refine, extend and apply this pre-existing knowledge but will not achieve any more great "revolutions or revelations."

Nobel laureate Phil Anderson wrote in 1999 "The reason that Horgan's pessimism is so wrong lies in the nature of science itself. Whenever a question receives an answer, science moves on and asks a new kind of question, of which there seem to be an endless supply." A front-page review in The New York Times called the book "intellectually bracing, sweepingly reported, often brilliant and sometimes bullying."

In 2000 Horgan wrote a supportive review of Patrick Tierney's Darkness in El Dorado in the New York Times. This review recounted, uncritically, the many accusations leveled against anthropologist Napoleon Chagnon during his field work in Amazonas with the Yanomamö. The resulting controversy ultimately caused Chagnon to retire early from his academic post. However, the book was later found to be fraudulent, and an inquiry by the American Anthropological Association cleared Chagnon of Tierney's accusations.

Later work
In 1999 Horgan followed up The End of Science with The Undiscovered Mind: How the Human Brain Defies Replication, Medication and Explanation, which critiques neuroscience, psychoanalysis, psychopharmacology, evolutionary psychology, behavioral genetics, artificial intelligence and other mind-related fields. For his 2003 book Rational Mysticism, he profiled a number of scientists, mystics, and religious thinkers who have delved into the interface of science, religion and mysticism. He presents his personal impressions of these individuals and a sometimes controversial analysis of their contributions to rational mysticism and the relationship between religion and science. His 2012 book "The End of War" presents scientific arguments against the widespread belief that war is inevitable.

In 2005, Horgan became the Director of the Center for Science Writings (CSW) at Stevens Institute of Technology, in Hoboken, NJ, where he also teaches science journalism, history of science and other courses. The CSW sponsors lectures by leading science communicators, including geographer Jared Diamond of UCLA, financier/philosopher Nassim Taleb, psychologist Steven Pinker of Harvard, neurologist Oliver Sacks, philosopher Peter Singer of Princeton, economist Jeffrey Sachs of Columbia, and biologist Edward O. Wilson of Harvard.

Media appearances 

Horgan has appeared on the Charlie Rose show, the Lehrer News Hour and many other media outlets in the U.S. and Europe. Currently he is a frequent host (usually with science writer George Johnson) of "Science Faction", a monthly discussion related to science topics on the website BloggingHeads.tv.

Political views 
Horgan has stated that "part of  me wonders whether research on race and intelligence—given the persistence of racism in the U.S. and elsewhere—should simply be banned." He has described James Damore and others as "bullies" who "deserve to be fired."

Bibliography

Books
(1996), The End of Science: Facing the Limits of Science in the Twilight of the Scientific Age. New York: Broadway Books.
(1999). The Undiscovered Mind: How the Human Brain Defies Replication, Medication and Explanation. New York: Touchstone.
With Reverend Frank Greer (2002).  Where Was God on September 11? (A Scientist Asks a Ground Zero Pastor).  San Francisco: Browntrout Publishers.
(2003). Rational Mysticism: Dispatches from the Border Between Science and Spirituality. New York: Houghton Mifflin.
(2012). The End of War. San Francisco: McSweeney's.
(2018). Mind-Body Problems: Science, Subjectivity & Who We Really Are. (Free online book)
(2020). Pay Attention: Sex, Death, and Science. Terra Nova Press.

Articles
  https://web.archive.org/web/20110920161218/http://lilt.ilstu.edu/gmklass/foi/readings/horgan.htm
 
 
Horgan, John. October 2006. "The Final Frontier: Ten years after the publication of The End of Science, John Horgan says the limits of scientific inquiry are more visible than ever." Discover Magazine http://discovermagazine.com/2006/oct/cover#.UW8uaKV5nzI
Horgan, John. June 2008. "The Consciousness Conundrum: The wetware that gives rise to consciousness is far too complex to be replicated in a computer anytime soon." IEEE Spectrum. https://spectrum.ieee.org/biomedical/imaging/the-consciousness-conundrum
Horgan, John. March 2013. "The Drones Come Home." National Geographic http://ngm.nationalgeographic.com/2013/03/unmanned-flight/horgan-text
Horgan, John. April 2021. "Will Quantum Computing Ever Live Up to Its Hype?" Scientific American https://www.scientificamerican.com/article/will-quantum-computing-ever-live-up-to-its-hype/

References

External links

 
 Scientific American blog, "Cross-check"
 The Center for Science Writings
 John Horgan discusses his 2012 book The End of War on "Big Think"

1953 births
Living people
American science writers
American science journalists
American male journalists
Columbia University Graduate School of Journalism alumni
Columbia University School of General Studies alumni
Video bloggers
Male bloggers
Stevens Institute of Technology faculty